Kaposi can refer to:

 Moritz Kaposi, a Hungarian physician and dermatologist
 Kaposi's sarcoma, a disease named for Kaposi